Nan Nyunt Swe (1923 – 14 July 2010), born Aung Thein, was a distinguished Burmese writer, writing over 1,200 poems and 800 articles throughout his sixty-year-long career, focusing primarily on music and classic literature. In 1955, he married fellow writer Hla Kyi, who had the pen name Yuwadi Kyi Oo. He died on 14 July 2010 of natural causes. He published four novels in his career: Myitta Tay Than Kabya Mya (1961), Sasoman Kabya Mya (1978), Anu Pyinna Aman (1980), and Pale Myeikson Kabya Mya (1995). His son Thura, better known by his stage name Zarganar, is a well-known comedian.

References

1923 births
Burmese writers
2010 deaths
Burmese male poets
Burmese novelists
People from Bago Region
20th-century Burmese poets
20th-century novelists
20th-century male writers